WIBA (1310 kHz) is a commercial AM radio station licensed to Madison, Wisconsin.  Owned by iHeartMedia, the station airs a Conservative Talk format, under the slogan "Madison's News/Talk Station."

WIBA operates at 5,000 watts around the clock.  By day, the station is non-directional but at night it uses a directional antenna to protect other stations on 1310 AM.  The studios, offices and transmitter are located off South Fish Hatchery Road at Lacy Road in Fitchburg, Wisconsin.

Programming
WIBA broadcasts mainly syndicated conservative talk shows. Most of the syndicated programming comes from Premiere Networks, a subsidiary of iHeartMedia, along with other programming from sister station WISN (1130) in Milwaukee. The first local show on weekdays is Madison in The Morning with Robin Colbert and Shawn Prebil. WISN's Dan O'Donnell follows, then Clay Travis & Buck Sexton, and 
local talk with Vicki McKenna (although sister WISN simulcasts her first hour) from 2 to 5 p.m. The remainder of the weekday schedule includes Sean Hannity, a best-of program featuring content from Madison in the Morning, then Mark Levin, Coast to Coast AM with George Noory and This Morning, America's First News with Gordon Deal.

Weekends feature shows on money, health and law, including syndicated shows from Dave Ramsey, Bill Handel, Somewhere in Time with Art Bell, Bill Cunningham, as well as repeats of weekday shows.  Some paid brokered programming also airs.

Sports
WIBA serves as the flagship station for the Wisconsin Badgers radio network. It is also the Madison outlet for Green Bay Packers football broadcasts.

History
WIBA is the oldest commercial radio station in Wisconsin, signing on the air on April 2, 1925.  It was owned by the Capital Times newspaper.  It is the second-oldest station in the state overall, with the University of Wisconsin's WHA getting its license three years earlier but never as a commercial broadcaster.  WIBA had its studios at 111 King Street.  It eventually became an NBC Red Network affiliate.

On October 8, 1935, the Federal Communications Commission authorized WIBA to increase its power to 5,000 watts (daytime) and 1,000 watts (nights).

In 1969, it added WIBA-FM at 101.5.  At first, the FM station simulcast AM 1310.  It eventually broke away, to start a free form rock format.

Throughout WIBA's history the station has gradually pivoted from a local news and sports outlet to primarily an outlet for syndicated conservative political programming with the morning news show the only remaining local programming aside from Badgers play by play. The station also retains Packers and Brewers play by play. 

Willard Waterman, who later gained fame playing the title role on The Great Gildersleeve, was a member of a quartet at WIBA in his early years in radio. In 1963, he recalled, "[W]e sang musical interludes between programs." Johnny Olson, known for his announcing work with Goodson-Todman game shows, had his first radio job at WIBA.

References

External links

WIBA station website
From the Wisconsin Historical Society: A 1938 Capital Times article on WIBA's 14th birthday
FCC History Cards for WIBA

IBA
News and talk radio stations in the United States
IHeartMedia radio stations